Ahmed Ramadan can refer to:

 Ahmed Ramadan (field hockey) (born 1972), Egyptian field hockey player
 Ahmed Ramadan (footballer), Egyptian footballer
 Ahmed Ramadan (politician), Ghanaian politician